The 2008–09 GP2 Asia Series season was the second season of the GP2 Asia Series. It began on 18 October 2008 and ended on 26 April 2009 and consisted of twelve races at six events.

Season summary 
All teams from the 2008 GP2 Series season except for Racing Engineering took part in the competition, with the thirteenth slot being filled by Qi-Meritus Mahara. The reigning champion Romain Grosjean did not defend his title.

Kamui Kobayashi clinched the title with a fourth place at the penultimate race in Bahrain. 8 different winners were in 12 races: Kamui Kobayashi become champion, after Japanese won in two consecutive feature races at Dubai Autodrome, and at Bahrain International Circuit.

Diego Nunes won the last two feature races at Sepang International Circuit, and at Bahrain International Circuit. Roldán Rodríguez wins in first race of the season. Nico Hülkenberg, Luiz Razia, Vitaly Petrov, Davide Valsecchi, and Sergio Pérez each other won one race.

Entry list
All of the teams used the Dallara GP2/05 chassis with Renault-badged 4.0 litre (244 cu in) naturally-aspirated Mecachrome V8 engines order and with tyres supplied by Bridgestone.

* – team was known as BCN Competición at round one in Shanghai, before Tiago Monteiro bought over the team's assets and renamed it as Ocean Racing Technology.

Calendar
On 12 July, GP2 Series organisers announced a provisional calendar for their second season. Unlike the first season of the GP2 Asia Series, this season will start prior to the new year, and be expanded to six events from the previous five. The Indonesian round has been dropped, while Bahrain earns a second event and Shanghai earns its first GP2 races. Shanghai will also host the official GP2 Asia Series test session prior to the start of the season.

The sprint race of the second round of the championship – at the Dubai Autodrome – was cancelled due to flooding.

On 17 December, an alteration was made to the calendar, with the Losail International Circuit in Qatar replacing the February meeting in Dubai. The meeting was also moved to February 12–14 because the original date on the calendar was unsuitable, due to MotoGP testing. This event introduced night racing to GP2, following the circuit's lead with MotoGP and its support classes and also Formula One's night race in Singapore.

Race Calendar

Championship standings
Scoring system
Points are awarded to the top 8 classified finishers in the Feature race, and to the top 6 classified finishers in the Sprint race. The pole-sitter in the feature race will also receive two points, and one point is given to the driver who set the fastest lap inside the top ten in both the feature and sprint races. No extra points are awarded to the pole-sitter in the sprint race.

Feature race points

Sprint race points
Points are awarded to the top 6 classified finishers.

Drivers' Championship

Notes:
† — Drivers did not finish the race, but were classified as they completed over 90% of the race distance.

Teams' Championship

Notes:
† — Drivers did not finish the race, but were classified as they completed over 90% of the race distance.

Notes

References

External links
GP2 Series official website
GP2 Asia Series fansite

GP2 Asia
GP2 Asia
GP2 Asia Series seasons
GP2 Asia Series
GP2 Asia Series